"Where's Your Money?" is a single by Busta Rhymes featuring ODB. It is produced by Hill, who has produced songs for Nas, "Purple", and "Black Zombies" off the 2002 The Lost Tapes. "Where's Your Money" was released on September 27, 2005. It was supposed to be the first single off The Big Bang but was cancelled.

Charts

References 

                

 

Busta Rhymes songs
Aftermath Entertainment singles
Interscope Records singles